Billiard and snooker at the 2011 Southeast Asian Games are held at Jakabaring Billiard Arena, Palembang.

Medal summary

Men

Women

Medal table

External links
  2011 Southeast Asian Games

2011 Southeast Asian Games events
Cue sports at the Southeast Asian Games
Cue sports in Indonesia